"Here I Go" is a song by Australian rock band The Screaming Jets. The song was released in June 1993 as the third single from the band's second studio album Tear of Thought (1992). The song peaked at number 63 on the ARIA Charts.

Track listings
 Australian Single
 "Here I Go" (radio version) - 3:32
 "C'Mon"(live) - 3:23
 "Dream On"(live) - 5:37
 "Tunnel"(live) - 4:38
 "Better"(live) - 5:25
 "Here I Go" (album version) - 4:47
 Live tracks recorded on tour in the UK by BBC Radio and broadcast on 16 April 1993.

 UK single
 "Here I Go" - 4:47
 "Think" (acoustic) - 5:23
 "Pretty Vacant" - 3:00
 "F.R.C." (live) - 7:45
 Live track recorded live at The Palais, Newcastle in May 1991.

Charts

Release history

References

1992 songs
1993 singles
The Screaming Jets songs